Teloganopsis is a genus of spiny crawler mayflies in the family Ephemerellidae. There are about 17 described species in Teloganopsis.

Species
These 17 species belong to the genus Teloganopsis:

 Teloganopsis albai (Gonzales del Tanago & Garcia de Jalon, 1983)
 Teloganopsis bauernfeindi (Thomas, Marie & Dia, 2000)
 Teloganopsis brocha (Kang & Yang, 1995)
 Teloganopsis changbaishanensis (Su & You, 1988)
 Teloganopsis chinoi (Gose, 1980)
 Teloganopsis deficiens (Morgan, 1911) (little black quill)
 Teloganopsis gracilis (Tshernova, 1952)
 Teloganopsis hispanica (Eaton, 1887)
 Teloganopsis jinghongensis (Xu, You & Hsu, 1984)
 Teloganopsis maculocaudata (Ikonomov, 1961)
 Teloganopsis media Ulmer, 1939
 Teloganopsis mesoleuca (Brauer, 1857)
 Teloganopsis oriens (Jacobus & McCafferty, 2006)
 Teloganopsis puigae Ubero-Pascal & Sartori, 2009
 Teloganopsis punctisetae (Matsumura, 1931)
 Teloganopsis setosa Zhou, 2017
 Teloganopsis subsolana (Allen, 1973)

References

Further reading

External links

 

Mayflies
Articles created by Qbugbot